John Chandlee Astle (born March 31, 1943) is an American politician from Maryland and a member of the Democratic Party. He served four terms in the Maryland State Senate and three terms in the Maryland House of Delegates representing Maryland's district 30 in Anne Arundel County.

Background
Astle was born in Charles Town, West Virginia, and grew up in Barboursville. He graduated in 1966 from Marshall University in Huntington, West Virginia, and attended the Catholic University of America.

Military service — United States Marine Corps
He joined the United States Marine Corps Reserve in 1961 and received a commission as an officer in the Marine Corps through its Platoon Leaders Class program upon graduation from Marshall. He was a Naval Aviator flying helicopters and left active duty with the rank of captain. He also flew the presidential helicopter for three and a half years.

He retired from the Marine Corps Reserves as a colonel after 30 years of service. He saw combat in Vietnam, earning 34 Air Medals and 2 Purple Hearts. He was recalled to active duty for Desert Storm.

Political career

Astle was originally elected to the Maryland House of Delegates in 1982. He was elected to the State Senate in 1994 and was Vice-Chair of the Senate Finance Committee from 2003 to 2019.

Astle ran unsuccessfully for mayor of Annapolis in 2017, losing closely in the Democratic primary. Astle also ran for mayor in 1981, losing by 243 votes in the general election.

Election results
1990 race for Maryland House of Delegates – District 30
Voters to choose three:
{| class="wikitable"
!Name
!Votes
!Percent
!Outcome
|-
|-
|John C. Astle, Dem.
|18,009
|  23%
|   Won
|-
|-
|Aris Allen, Rep.
|16,951
|  22%
|   Won
|-
|-
|Michael E. Busch, Dem.
|16,104
|  18%
|   Won
|-
|-
|Edith Segree, Dem.
|14,341
|  18%
|   Lost
|-
|-
|Phillip Bissett, Rep.
|13,321
|  17%
|   Lost
|}

References

Important family members include Sabrina Astle

1943 births
Living people
Democratic Party Maryland state senators
Catholic University of America alumni
Marshall University alumni
Recipients of the Legion of Merit
Aviators from West Virginia
Military personnel from West Virginia
People from Barboursville, West Virginia
United States Marine Corps personnel of the Vietnam War
United States Marine Corps personnel of the Gulf War
People from Anne Arundel County, Maryland
People from Charles Town, West Virginia
21st-century American politicians
United States Marine Corps reservists
United States Marine Corps colonels
United States Naval Aviators